Clinton Township was a township located in Essex County, New Jersey, United States, which existed from 1834 to 1902.

Clinton Township was created on April 14, 1834, from portions of Elizabeth Township, Newark Township, Orange Township and Union Township. Clinton Township included present-day Irvington and Maplewood and parts of Newark and South Orange. 

On April 1, 1861, South Orange Township (now Maplewood) was formed from portions of Clinton Township and Orange.

Irvington was formed as an independent village as of March 27, 1874, and became fully independent as a town on March 2, 1898. The town's Clinton Cemetery, opened in 1844, refers to the earlier name.

What remained of the old township was absorbed into Newark on March 5, 1902, based on the results of a referendum held on March 11, 1902. The area is now part of the Clinton Hill neighborhood of Newark.

References

External links
 History of Irvington
 Newark's Changing Boundaries

1834 establishments in New Jersey
1902 disestablishments in New Jersey
Former municipalities in Essex County, New Jersey
Former townships in New Jersey
Populated places established in 1834